The 2010 Seguros Bolívar Open Bogotá was a professional tennis tournament played on outdoor red clay courts. This was the sixth edition of the tournament which was part of the 2010 ATP Challenger Tour and the 2010 ITF Women's Circuit. It took place in Bogotá, Colombia between 12 July and 18 July 2010.

ATP entrants

Seeds

 Rankings are as of July 5, 2010.

Other entrants
The following players received wildcards into the singles main draw:
  Robert Farah
  Roberto Livi
  Nicolás Massú
  Eduardo Struvay

The following players received entry from the qualifying draw:
  Júlio César Campozano
  Guillermo Durán
  Iván Endara
  Ty Trombetta

Champions

Men's singles

 Robert Farah def.  Carlos Salamanca, 6–3, 2–6, 7–6(3)

Women's singles

 Paula Ormaechea def.  Julia Cohen, 7–5, 6–1

Men's doubles

 Juan Sebastián Cabal /  Robert Farah def.  Víctor Estrella /  Alejandro González 7–6(6), 6–4

Women's doubles

 Andrea Gámiz /  Paula Ormaechea def.  Mailen Auroux /  Karen Emilia Castiblanco Duarte, 5–7, 6–4, [10–8]

References
Official website of Seguros Bolívar Tennis

Seguros Bolivar Open Bogota
Seguros Bolivar Open Bogota
2010
2010 in Colombian tennis